George William Stewart (21 November 1873 – 27 May 1937) was an Australian rules footballer who played with St Kilda in the Victorian Football League (VFL).

References

External links 

1873 births
1937 deaths
Australian rules footballers from Melbourne
St Kilda Football Club players
South Yarra Football Club players
People from Prahran, Victoria